The Elsinore Fault Zone is a large right-lateral strike-slip geological fault structure in Southern California. The fault is part of the trilateral split of the San Andreas fault system and is one of the largest, though quietest faults in Southern California.

Fault characteristics 
It is estimated that this zone is capable of producing a quake of 6.5–7.5 MW. The projected interval between major rupture events is 250 years.

The last major rupture event on the main Elsinore fault was in 1910 with a 6 MW earthquake centered just northwest of the city of Lake Elsinore.

Fault segments and geography 
The fault runs from the mountainous Peninsular Ranges region between El Centro and San Diego, northwest to the Chino Hills range and Chino Hills.  On the southern end of the fault zone is the southeastern extension of the Elsinore fault zone, the Laguna Salada Fault.  At its northern end, the Elsinore fault zone splits into two segments, the Chino Fault and the Whittier Fault.  In the Elsinore Trough, the Elsinore fault zone creates four graben rift valleys between the Santa Ana Mountain Block and the Perris Block: the Temescal Valley, the Elsinore Valley with its large sag pond of Lake Elsinore and the Temecula Valley and Wolf Valley.  In the Elsinore Trough the fault zone is split into pairs of parallel strands with the Glen Ivy North Fault and Lee Lake Fault forming the first valley, the Glen Ivy South Fault and Willard Faults the second and the Willard and Wildomar Faults the last two valleys to the southeast.

A multi-year study published in 2018 suggests a connection between the Elsinore Fault and other fault lines farther south, in Mexico: "...observations of the Yuha Desert and Salton Trough suggest that the 2010 M7.2 El Mayor ‐ Cucapah earthquake rupture, the Laguna Salada fault in Baja California, Mexico, and the Elsinore fault in California are part of the same fault system."

References

Further reading

External links 
 M6.5 Earthquake on the Elsinore Fault (Santa Ana) – Southern California Earthquake Center

Seismic faults of California
Strike-slip faults
Geology of Los Angeles County, California
Geology of Orange County, California
Geology of Riverside County, California
Geology of San Bernardino County, California
Geology of San Diego County, California
Inland Empire
Natural history of Los Angeles County, California
Natural history of Orange County, California
Natural history of Riverside County, California
Natural history of San Bernardino County, California
Peninsular Ranges